Little Prayers and Finite Experience is a book of prose and poetry by Paul Goodman.

Publication 

Harper & Row first published 5,000 copies of Little Prayers and Finite Experience on October 11, 1972. Wildwood House distributed its British edition in November 1973.

References

External links 

 

1972 books
Books by Paul Goodman
English-language books
American poetry collections
Harper & Row books